The Dipo Rites is arguably one of the most popular yet criticized traditional festival and practice in Ghana, yet one of the most attended event in the country, receiving huge patronage from tourists. The traditional festival is celebrated by the people of Odumase krobo in the Eastern region of Ghana. The festival is celebrated in the month of April every year. The festival is used to usher virgin girls into puberty or womanhood, and it signifies that a participating girl is of age to be married. Parents upon hearing announcement of the rites send their qualified girls to the chief priest. However these girls would have to go through rituals and tests to prove their chastity before they qualify to partake in the festival.

On the first day of the rites, the girls have their heads shaved and dressed with cloth around their waist to just their knee level. This is done by a special ritual mother and it signifies their transition from childhood to adulthood. They are paraded to the entire community as the initiates (dipo-yo).

Early the next morning, the chief priest gives the initiates a ritual bath. He pours libation to ask for blessings for the girls. He then washes their feet with the blood of a goat which their parents presented. This is to drive away any spirit of barrenness. The crucial part of the rite is when the girls sit on the sacred stone. This is to prove their virginity. However, any girl found to be pregnant or not a virgin is detested by the community and does not entice a man from the tribe.

The girls are then housed for a week, where they are given training on cooking, housekeeping, and child birth and nurture. The ritual mothers give them special lessons on seduction and how their husbands will expect to be treated. They learn the Klama dance which will be performed on the final day of the rites.

After the one-week schooling, they are released and the entire community gather to celebrate their transition into womanhood. They are beautifully dressed in rich kente cloth accessorised with beads around their waist, neck and arms. With singing and drumming, they perform the Klama dance. At this point, any man interested in any one of them can start investigating into her family. 
It is assumed that any lady who partakes in the rites not only brings honour to herself but to her family at large. It is done to initiate young women into knowing their responsibilities before stepping into marriage.

References

Festivals in Ghana
Ghanaian culture
Rites of passage